James F. Pasquarette (born 1961) is a retired lieutenant general in the United States Army, who last served as the deputy Chief of Staff of the Army G-8, previously serving as Commanding General of United States Army Japan. He is a graduate of Furman University and was commissioned in 1983.

Pasquarette retired from the Army effective May 27, 2021.

Dates of rank

References

1961 births
Furman University alumni
Living people
Recipients of the Distinguished Service Medal (US Army)
Recipients of the Legion of Merit
United States Army generals
United States Army personnel of the Iraq War